Cypraeovula capensis, common name the Cape cowrie, is a species of sea snail, a cowry, a marine gastropod mollusk in the family Cypraeidae, the cowries.

Subspecies
The following subspecies are accepted :
Cypraeovula capensis archilyra Van Heesvelde & Deprez, 2006
Cypraeovula capensis capensis (Gray, 1828)
 Cypraeovula capensis cineracea Aiken, 2016
Cypraeovula capensis gonubiensis Massier, 1993
Cypraeovula capensis gorda Van Heesvelde & Deprez, 2006
Cypraeovula capensis profundorum Seccombe, 2003

Distribution
This marine species occurs off the East Coast of South Africa.

References

 Turton W.H. (1932). Marine Shells of Port Alfred, S. Africa. Humphrey Milford, London, xvi + 331 pp., 70 pls.
 Steyn, D.G & Lussi, M. (2005). Offshore Shells of Southern Africa: A pictorial guide to more than 750 Gastropods. Published by the authors. Pp. i–vi, 1–289.

Endemic fauna of South Africa
Cypraeidae
Gastropods described in 1828
Taxa named by John Edward Gray